Binstead is a village on the Isle of Wight. In the 2011 Census Binstead had been incorporated within Ryde whilst still retaining its electoral ward, Binsted and Fishbourne.

Amenities
The village has a post office/general store as its sole remaining store; until the end of February 2009 when it was removed, it also had a phone box outside. There was also a second shop located opposite the Post Office until sometime in the 2000s, but it is now a residential dwelling.

Binstead has a primary school, two recreational fields, access to a public common (Dame Anthony's Common) and beach (Player's Beach).

Brickfields, a small horse riding centre, was located off Newnham Road to the south of Binstead but it closed in 2013.

The local pub is "The Fleming Arms", located on Binstead Road.

Southern Vectis bus route 9 serves the main road every 10 minutes in the daytime between Ryde and Newport. Route 4 links the town with East Cowes and local route 37 covers other areas linking to Ryde.

History
Binstead is recorded in 1086 in the Domesday Book as Benestede. It became known for the quality of its limestone which led to a local quarrying industry, the result of which is still visible in the village's landscape and place names. The nearby Quarr Abbey takes its name from ‘quarry’ and the suffix ‘pitts’ is occasionally found in house and road names. The quarries were known as pits.

Though there are reports that it has been quarried as far back as the Roman occupation, the earliest recorded quarrying was by the first Norman Bishop of Winchester, Walkelin, who was granted half a hide (60 acres) of land by William the Conqueror. He used the stone to construct Winchester Cathedral starting in 1079. Subsequently, the stone was used in the building of Chichester Cathedral, Romsey Abbey and part of the Tower of London.

During the Napoleonic War Daniel List, a local shipwright, successfully carried out shipbuilding at Binstead for the Royal Navy, comprising three 36-gun frigates - HMS Magicienne in 1812, and HMS Tagus and HMS Tiber in 1813.

By 1905 the parish had 1,206 acres of land.

Churches

Binstead has two churches the Methodist Church, built in 1889, and the Church of the Holy Cross, constructed around 1150 (though went through remodelling in the 13th and 19th centuries). The monastery Quarr Abbey is also located nearby.

References

External links

Villages on the Isle of Wight